"The Greatest" is a song by New Zealand band Six60, released as the lead single from their third album Six60 in July 2019. The song was a commercial success, becoming triple Platinum certified in New Zealand. In 2023, a new Māori language version of the song, "Te Taumata", was used as the theme song for the 2023 Te Matatini kapa haka festival.

Background and composition

The song was written and produced by the band in collaboration with American music producer Malay, and was one of the first songs the group wrote together with Malay. The song was inspired by a 1964 photo of British band the Beatles meeting boxer Muhammad Ali. The band wanted to create a song expressing how they wanted to continue to strive to be better musicians and people.

The single artwork is an homage to the photo of the Beatles and Ali.

Release and promotion 

The song was released on 26 July 2019, as the leading single from their third studio album Six60. The band released a trailer for their documentary Six60: Till the Lights Go Out at the time of the release of "The Greatest".

In 2023, "The Greatest" was re-recorded in Māori as "Te Taumata". The track was translated with the help of Max Matenga, and served as the theme song of the 2023 Te Matatini kapa haka festival. The song will be released as the 50th song released from He Tau Makuru, an album project celebrating the 50th anniversary of Te Matatini.

Critical reception

The song was nominated for the Aotearoa Music Award for Single of the Year at the 2019 New Zealand Music Awards, losing to "Soaked" by Benee

Credits and personnel
Credits adapted from Tidal.

Printz Board – songwriting
Evan Bogart – songwriting
Matt Chamberlain – drums
Ji Fraser – guitar
Malay – engineer, guitar, production, songwriting
Marlon Gerbes – guitar, keyboards, songwriting
Raul Lopez – assistant recording engineer
Chris Mac – bass guitar
Michelle Mancini – mastering engineer
Manny Marroquin – mixer
Eli Paewai – drums
Six60 – performer
Matiu Walters – songwriting, vocals

Charts

Year-end charts

Certifications

References

2019 singles
2019 songs
New Zealand pop songs
Six60 songs
Songs written by Malay (record producer)